Margot Zuidhof (born 12 May 1992) is a Dutch field hockey player. Zuidhof played for HC Helmond and THC Hurley; she currently plays for SV Kampong.

Zuidhof made her debut for the Netherlands national team in January 2017 in a friendly match against Spain.  She won the gold medal at the 2018 Champions Trophy in Changzhou, China.

References

1992 births
Living people
Dutch female field hockey players
Female field hockey forwards
SV Kampong players